Iskandar Safa (born April 1952) is a French businessman of Lebanese origin. Together with his brother Akram Safa, he is the owner of  Privinvest Holding, a major international naval construction group. In addition to this, Iskandar Safa and his brother Akram control, through P.I. Dev SAL, the French company FIMAS SA specialised in developing and managing real estate properties in the South of France. Iskandar and Akram are being sued for $2 billion by the Republic of Mozambique in an alleged corruption scandal.

Safa also owns Valmonde which publishes the weekly 'Valeurs Actuelles', a conservative right-wing publication that often takes anti-Islamic and anti-feminist stances.

Early life
Safa was born in Beirut in 1952 to a Maronite Christian family. In the late 1970s, Safa enrolled in the American University of Beirut, graduating with a degree in civil engineering. He left Lebanon to become a junior civil engineer in the United States, and then moved to France, where in 1982 he graduated with an MBA from INSEAD in Fontainebleau.

Career
From 1978 to 1981,  Iskandar Safa was working as a site engineer for INECC at the King Abdulaziz Military Academy project in Salbukh, near Riyadh)

In 1986, he became President of Triacorp International. On 19 January 2005, he stepped down as President of the company’s steering committee in favor of Eric Giardini.

During the 1990s Iskandar and his brother Akram founded Privinvest, a shipbuilding company specialising in naval and commercial vessels and mega yachts.

In 1992, he was elected by the CIRI (Comité Interministériel de Restructuration Industrielle) to purchase the Constructions Mécaniques de Normandie (CMN) in Cherbourg and managed to turn around the naval construction shipyard that was facing difficulties at the times. The CMN became a French company affiliated to Privinvest Group.  He is also President of the council of FIMAS Group which owns marble carriers in the town Saint-Pons-de-Thomières located in Herault, France, also called ‘Marbres de France’.

In 2007, Iskandar Safa took part in the creation of the Abu Dhabi Mar naval construction site with Al Aïn International and became executive director. Later on in 2011, Privinvest purchased Al Aïn International’s shares.

On 1 March 2018, a German consortium consisting of Thyssen Krupp and Luerssen is excluded by the German Government from the tender for the construction of the multi-purpose warship MKS 180 for the benefit of GNY (German Naval Yards), belonging to the Prinvinvest group, and the Dutch shipbuilder Damen.

In January 2019, Safa announced his intention to take over the regional newspaper Nice-Matin. In July of the same year, he withdrew from the process due to a competing bid from French billionaire, Xavier Niel, as well as opposition from the newspaper's editorial staff.

In July 2019, Safa acquired a 39% stake in a Nice-based private TV station, Azur TV. Azur provides news services for the area of the Mediterranean coast between Marseilles and Menton.

May 2020 saw the announcement that the German naval yards in Kiel, owned and run by Safa's Privinvest Holding SAL group, were entering into a long-term co-operation agreement with the Lürssen shipyard company based in Bremen. The idea behind the partnership is to improve the overall German shipbuilding sector and to improve sustainability and efficiency.

Other roles
Since 2011 Iskandar Safa has been the non-executive vice-president of the Marfin Investment Group’s steering committee, a holding company listed on the Athens’ stock-exchange.

Safa is considered to be one of Lebanon's wealthiest individuals.

As Safa is a Maronite Christian, he offered unlimited supplies of marble from the quarry he owns in southern France to aid in the rebuilding of Notre Dame Cathedral, devastated by fire in April 2019.

References

1952 births
Living people
20th-century French businesspeople
French people of Lebanese descent
Lebanese Maronites